Malacca City Council, officially known as the Historical Malacca City Council (MBMB) is the city council which administers Malacca City and most part of Melaka Tengah District. It is responsible for public health and sanitation, cleanliness management, town planning, environmental protection and building control, social and economic development and general maintenance functions of urban infrastructure. The MBMB main headquarters is located at Graha Makmur in Ayer Keroh, just outside its area of jurisdiction and opposite that of Hang Tuah Jaya Municipal Council at Melaka Mall (formerly known as Kotamas).

History

The council later became known as the Malacca Municipal Council (Majlis Perbandaran Melaka) in 1987 and the Historical City of Malacca Municipal Council (Majlis Perbandaran Melaka Bandaraya Bersejarah, MPMBB) on 15 April 1989 when the federal government granted the Historical City title to the town of Malacca. The headquarters of the council was originally located at the building, which now houses the People's Museum, Kite Museum and the Beauty Museum, before being moved to the present building in Ayer Keroh. The council obtained its present name on 15 April 2003 when Malacca Town was granted city status.

On 1 January 2010, part of its area including the headquarters' building, covering  was separated for the establishment of Hang Tuah Jaya Municipal Council (Majlis Perbandaran Hang Tuah Jaya, MPHTJ).

List of mayors

See also
 Hang Tuah Jaya Municipal Council

References

External links 

Local government in Malacca
City councils in Malaysia